Hartmut Schreiber (born 28 January 1944 in Wittich) is a German rower, who competed for the SC Dynamo Berlin / Sportvereinigung (SV) Dynamo. He won several medals at international rowing competitions.

References 

1944 births
Living people
Olympic medalists in rowing
East German male rowers
World Rowing Championships medalists for East Germany
Medalists at the 1972 Summer Olympics
Olympic bronze medalists for East Germany
Olympic rowers of East Germany
Rowers at the 1972 Summer Olympics
European Rowing Championships medalists